Stephen Charles Finch (born January 2, 1961 in Great Lakes, Illinois) is a former professional American football player who played wide receiver for one season for the Minnesota Vikings.

1961 births
Living people
American football wide receivers
Chicago Bruisers players
Minnesota Vikings players
People from Great Lakes, Illinois
Elmhurst Bluejays football players
National Football League replacement players